The following is a list of flags, standards and banners used in Kuwait.

National Flag

Royal Flag

Former Royal Flags

Military Flag

Municipality Flag

Historical Flags

Under Pre-Islamic Persia

Under Arab Rule

Under The Buyid dynasty

Seljuk Empire

Under Mongol Rule

Qara Qoyunlu

Aq Qoyunlu

Timurid Empire

Under Portuguese Rule

Safavid Dynasty

Ottoman Empire

Under British Rule

Independence

Under Iraq

Proposal Flags

See also 

 Flag of Kuwait
 Emblem of Kuwait

References 

Lists and galleries of flags
Flags